Shakheh-ye Jadid (also Romanized as Shākheh-ye Jadīd) is a village in Hoseyni Rural District, in the Central District of Shadegan County, Khuzestan Province, Iran. At the 2006 census, its population was 30, in 4 families.

References 

Populated places in Shadegan County